Adam Lacko (born 24 September 1984 in Celadna) is a Czech auto racing driver.

Career
Lacko began his career in 1994 in karting. In 2000 he began competing in the Skoda Octavia Cup, in which he finished runner-up in 2002.

Lacko made the switch to truck racing in 2003, competing in the FIA European Truck Racing Championship, finishing fifth in the standings. He improved to finish third in 2004.

In 2005 Lacko made selected appearances in the World Touring Car Championship with IEP Team, and the FIA GT Championship. He began competing in the Porsche Carrera Cup Germany in 2006. He competed in ADAC GT Masters and FIA GT3 European Championship in 2008.

In 2009, Lacko competed in the FIA GT Championship with K plus K Motorsport.

Since 2011, Lacko has competed full time in the FIA European Truck Racing Championship. Lacko has seen a high level of success in the series, taking numerous race wins and winning the 2017 championship.

Racing record

Complete World Touring Car Championship results
(key) (Races in bold indicate pole position) (Races in italics indicate fastest lap)

References

External links
Official website
Career statistics at Driver Database

Living people
1984 births
Czech racing drivers
FIA GT Championship drivers
World Touring Car Championship drivers
ADAC GT Masters drivers
24H Series drivers
Porsche Carrera Cup Germany drivers